Loxosceles arizonica, known as the Arizona brown spider, is a species of spider in the family Sicariidae. Field studies suggest that ants are its major prey, especially ants of the genera Novomessor and Camponotus.

References

Sicariidae
Spiders described in 1940
Spiders of North America